Parplar is the third studio album by folk artist Larkin Grimm. It was released in 2008, the first album on Young God Records.  The cover art was done by New York-based artist Lauren Beck.

Track listing
"They Were Wrong" – 3:43
"Ride That Cyclone" – 4:02
"Blond and Golden Johns" – 3:08
"Dominican Rum" – 3:55
"Parplar" – 2:09
"Durge" – 2:27
"Be My Host" – 3:02
"Mino Minou" – 1:36
"My Justine" – 4:34
"Anger in Your Liver" – 1:36
"All the Pleasures in the World" – 1:30
"Fall on My Knees" – 2:51
"How to Catch a Lizard" – 1:55
"The Dip" – 1:12
"Hope of the Hopeless" – 2:45

References

2008 albums
Larkin Grimm albums
Albums produced by Michael Gira
Young God Records albums